Johnny Silvo (born John Frederick Woods; 2 December 1936 – 19 December 2011) was a British folk and blues singer.

Biography
Born in 1936, Silvo started his career playing skiffle and jazz and singing solo in nightclubs. When the folk scene took off in the 60s he became a popular guest act at folk clubs.

In March 1967 he appeared with his own Johnny Silvo Folk Group on the Alex Campbell and His Friends LP alongside Sandy Denny. A month later an LP called Sandy and Johnny was released in which the two singers alternated songs. Silvo also performed for nine years as part of a duo with Dave Moses.

Johnny was also a presenter on Play School in the early 1970s.

Silvo continued to tour until 2011 when he was forced to cancel his autumn tour because of cancer.

Silvo died on 19 December 2011 aged 75, a few weeks after his birthday.

External links
 The Guardian obituary Derek Schofield 6th Jan 2012
 The Independent obituary Ken Hunt 27th Jan 2012

1936 births
2011 deaths
BBC television presenters
British folk singers
British blues singers